American Fighter Aces Association is a non-profit organization which recognizes the 1,450 combat American pilots (referred to as Aces) who have had five or more aerial victories in combat. The AFAA is located in Seattle's Museum of Flight. The exhibit houses documents, artifacts and histories of the Aces.

History
The American Fighter Aces Association was founded in 1960 to honor the 1,450 American "Ace" pilots. On September 23, 1960, The AFAA held its first reunion in San Francisco, Calif. To be a member honored by the association a pilot needs to have shot down at least five enemy aircraft in combat.

Mission
The mission of the organization is to Preserve the records of American combat fighter Aces. Part of the mission is also to educate future generations. The AFAA also awards scholarships each year.

Many of the Association's presidents have usually been aces. The organizations members are dying. In 2014  Lt. Gen. Charles "Chick" Cleveland served as president. Clayton Kelly Gross served as president in 2016 Rear Admiral Edward Feightner also served the AFAA as president.

Current living members

World War II

Vietnam War

American Fighter Aces Congressional Gold Medal Act

The American Fighter Aces Congressional Gold Medal was awarded to every American Fighter Ace, on May 23, 2014, by the 113th Congress. President and CEO of the AFAA attended a White House ceremony with President Barack Obama to sign the bill into law.

See also
List of World War II aces from the United States
List of World War II flying aces

References

External links
American Fighter Aces Association Video

Further reading

1960 establishments in the United States
Non-profit organizations based in Seattle
United States military support organizations
United States Navy support organizations
Organizations established in 1960
Museums in Seattle